In nonlinear control and stability theory, the circle criterion is a stability criterion for nonlinear time-varying systems. It can be viewed as a generalization of the Nyquist stability criterion for linear time-invariant (LTI) systems.

Overview

Consider a linear system subject to non-linear feedback, i.e. a non linear element  is present in the feedback loop. Assume that the element satisfies a sector condition , and (to keep things simple) that the open loop system is stable. Then the closed loop system is globally asymptotically stable if the Nyquist locus does not penetrate the circle having as diameter the segment  located on the x-axis.

General description
Consider the nonlinear system

 
 
 

Suppose that

 
  is stable
  

Then  such that for any solution of the system the following relation holds:

 

Condition 3 is also known as the frequency condition. Condition 1 the sector condition.

External links
 Sufficient Conditions for Dynamical Output Feedback Stabilization via the Circle Criterion
 Popov and Circle Criterion (Cam UK)
 Stability analysis using the circle criterion in Mathematica

References 

 

Nonlinear control
Stability theory